The Division of Hume is an Australian electoral division in the state of New South Wales.

Geography
Since 1984, federal electoral division boundaries in Australia have been determined at redistributions by a redistribution committee appointed by the Australian Electoral Commission. Redistributions occur for the boundaries of divisions in a particular state, and they occur every seven years, or sooner if a state's representation entitlement changes or when divisions of a state are malapportioned.

History

The division was proclaimed in 1900, and was one of the original 65 divisions to be contested at the first federal election. The division was named after Hamilton Hume, one of the first Europeans to travel through the area.

The division is located in the central part of the state, north of the Australian Capital Territory. The division covers a large rural and regional area, with agriculture being the main industry. It also includes a portion of outer Sydney suburbs at its northeastern extremity. It includes Boorowa and Goulburn in the west, parts of the Southern Highlands in the centre and Camden in the east. It includes the entire local government areas of Goulburn Mulwaree and Upper Lachlan shires and parts of Camden Council, Hilltops Council, the City of Liverpool, the City of Penrith, Wingecarribee Shire and Wollondilly Shire. Towns include Appin, Bargo, Boorowa, Bundanoon, Camden, Camden Park, Colo Vale, Crookwell, Exeter, Goulburn, Hill Top, Marulan, Menangle, Meryla, Narellan, Oakdale, Penrose, Picton, Tahmoor, Tarago, Taralga, The Oaks, Thirlmere, Werai (part), Wingello (part), Wilton and Yerrinbool (part).

The current Member for Hume, since the 2013 federal election, is Angus Taylor, a member of the Liberal Party of Australia.

Members

Election results

References

External links
 Division of Hume - Australian Electoral Commission

Electoral divisions of Australia
Constituencies established in 1901
1901 establishments in Australia